The bullrout (Notesthes robusta), also commonly called freshwater stonefish or kroki, is a pale yellowish to dark-brown  coloured fish that lives in tidal estuaries and slow-flowing streams in eastern Australia, from Southern New South Wales to northern Queensland, Australia. It has on a very infrequent occurrence been caught at sea. Its spines are venomous. It is the only member of the genus Notesthes.

Taxonomy and etymology
The bullrout was first formally described in 1860 as Centropogon robustus by the German-born British herpetologist and ichthyologist Albert Günther with its type locality given as New South Wales. The genus Notesthes was described in 1903 by the Australian ichthyologist James Douglas Ogilby as a monotypic genus for the bullrout. This taxon is included in the subfamily Tetraroginae within the Scorpaenidae in the 5th edition of Fishes of the World however other authorities place that subfamily within the stonefish family Synanceiidae, while other authorities classify this subfamily as a family in its own right. 

The genus name Netesthes combines notos, which means back, and esthes, meaning "a garment", an allusion to the completely scaled back of this taxon. The  specific name robusta means "stout" or "full-bodies" and allusion Günther did not explain but which maybe to its more robust body shape when compared to what was thought to be the closely related Eastern fortescue (Centropogon australis).

Description
The bullrout is big headed with bony ridges, a large mouth and a lower jaw which protrudes beyond the upper jaw. There are 7 spines on the operculum. There are 15 robust spines in the dorsal fin and this part of dorsal fin is slightly concave towards the rear with the rearmost soft ray in the dorsal fin being attached to the caudal peduncle by a membrane. The head has no scales but the body is clothed in small scales. The overall colour is pale yellowish to dark brown broken by dark reddish-brown to greyish or black irregular mottling which can coalesce to create irregular bands.

Distribution and habitat
The bullrout is endemic to eastern Australia where it occurs from north of Cooktown, Queensland south to Pambula, southern New South Wales. This fish lives in the lower freshwater stretches of rivers and streams, as well as in bays and estuaries. It is typically encountered within aquatic vegetation or woody debris in still or slow flowing freshwaters where there are rocky, muddy or gravel substrates.

Biology
The bullrout is a rather sedentary species in which individuals spend most of the time lying in wait on the bottom or among weeds for prey to pass, it is an ambush predator feeding on fishes and small crustaceans. They are known to migrate downstream in rivers during periods of heavy rainfall. They breed in freshwater and juveniles have been recorded from the upper reaches of rivers, upstream from barriers.

Danger to humans and first aid
The dorsal, anal, and pelvic spines on a bullrout have venom glands on them, and should be handled with extreme care.

References

External links
 Fishes of Australia : Notesthes robusta

Tetraroginae
Venomous fish
Marine fish of Eastern Australia
Fish described in 1903
Taxa named by Albert Günther